Van Staveren is a Dutch toponymic surname, meaning either "from Stavoren" or "from Staverden". Notable people with the surname include: 

 Cornelis van Staveren (1889–1982), Dutch Olympic sailor
 Heiko van Staveren (born 1942), Dutch field hockey player
 Herman van Staveren (1849–1930), New Zealand rabbi
 Jan Adriaensz van Staveren (1614–1669), Dutch painter
 Jean-Marie van Staveren (born 1946), Dutch painter
 Petra van Staveren (born 1966), Dutch Olympic swimmer 

Dutch-language surnames